Jonathan Massaquoi (born May 11, 1988) is a former Liberian professional American football outside linebacker. He was drafted by the Atlanta Falcons in the fifth round of the 2012 NFL Draft. He played college football at Troy.

College career
After playing his high school football at Central Gwinnett High School, Massaquoi attended Butler County Community College for a year before transferring to Troy University. During his two years at Troy he recorded 128 tackles and 19.5 sacks.

On January 13, 2012, Massaquoi announced that he would forgo his senior season and enter the 2012 NFL Draft.

Professional career

Atlanta Falcons
Massaquoi was drafted by the Atlanta Falcons in the 5th round (164th overall) in the 2012 NFL draft. He was waived on February 27, 2015.

Tennessee Titans
Massaquoi was claimed off waivers on March 3, 2015 by the Tennessee Titans. On September 6, 2015, he was waived by the Titans.

Kansas City Chiefs
Massaquoi signed with the Kansas City Chiefs on March 9, 2016. On August 28, 2016, Massaquoi was waived by the Chiefs.

Birmingham Iron
In 2018, Massaquoi signed with the Birmingham Iron of the Alliance of American Football for the 2019 season. In the season opener against the Memphis Express, Massaquoi recorded two sacks with seven tackles.

Calgary Stampeders
After the AAF ceased operations in April 2019, Massaquoi signed with the Calgary Stampeders of the Canadian Football League on May 17, 2019.

Dallas Renegades
In 2019, Massaquoi was selected by the Dallas Renegades in the 2020 XFL Draft. He was waived during final roster cuts on January 22, 2020.

DC Defenders
Massaquoi was claimed off waivers by the DC Defenders on January 22, 2020. He had his contract terminated when the league suspended operations on April 10, 2020.

References

External links
 Atlanta Falcons bio
 Troy Trojans bio

1988 births
Living people
People from Lawrenceville, Georgia
Sportspeople from the Atlanta metropolitan area
Sportspeople from Monrovia
Players of American football from Georgia (U.S. state)
Liberian players of American football
American football defensive ends
American football linebackers
Butler Grizzlies football players
Troy Trojans football players
Atlanta Falcons players
Tennessee Titans players
Kansas City Chiefs players
Birmingham Iron players
Dallas Renegades players
DC Defenders players
American players of Canadian football
Canadian football linebackers
Calgary Stampeders players